Cumnock Burgh was one of 10 electoral wards of Cumnock and Doon Valley District Council. Created in 1974, the ward elected one councillor using the first-past-the-post voting electoral system.

The ward was a Labour stronghold as the party successfully held the seat at every election since its creation until it was abolished.

In 1984, the ward was abolished and the area covered by it split between three newly created wards – Cumnock East, Cumnock South and Old Cumnock and Cumnock West and Auchinleck.

Boundaries
The Cumnock Burgh ward was created in 1974 by the Formation Electoral Arrangements from the previous Cumnock and Holmhead Burgh. The ward centered on the town of Cumnock and took in an area in the centre of Cumnock and Doon Valley. Following the Initial Statutory Reviews of Electoral Arrangements in 1981 the ward was abolished and replaced by three new wards – Cumnock East, Cumnock South and Old Cumnock and Cumnock West and Auchinleck.

Councillors

Election results

1980 election

1977 election

1974 election

References

Wards of East Ayrshire
Cumnock